Albert Vadas (March 26, 1876October 3, 1946) was a seaman of Croatian descent serving in the United States Navy during the Spanish–American War who received the Medal of Honor for bravery.

Biography
Vadas was born March 26, 1876, in Fiume, Austria-Hungary. After entering the United States Navy, he was sent to fight in the Spanish–American War aboard the USS Marblehead as a seaman.

Vadas died October 3, 1946, and is buried in Weehawken Cemetery, North Bergen, New Jersey.

Medal of Honor citation
Rank and organization: Seaman, U.S. Navy. (Named changed to Wadas, Albert.) Born: 26 March 1876, Austria-Hungary. Accredited to: New York. G.O. No.: 521, 7 July 1899.

Citation:

On board the U.S.S. Marblehead during the operation of cutting the cable leading from Cienfuegos, Cuba, 11 May 1898. Facing the heavy fire of the enemy, Vadas displayed extraordinary bravery and coolness throughout this period.

See also

List of Medal of Honor recipients for the Spanish–American War

References

External links

1876 births
1946 deaths
People from Rijeka
People from New York (state)
United States Navy Medal of Honor recipients
United States Navy sailors
American military personnel of the Spanish–American War
American people of Croatian descent
Austro-Hungarian emigrants to the United States
Foreign-born Medal of Honor recipients
Spanish–American War recipients of the Medal of Honor
Burials in New Jersey